Andrew Herron (1909–2003) was a Scottish minister and biblical scholar. He served as Moderator of the General Assembly of the Church of Scotland in 1971.

Life
He was born in Glasgow on 29 September 1909. He was educated at Strathbungo Higher Grade School and Albert Road Academy. He then studied Arts and Divinity at Glasgow University. He was ordained in 1934 and became assistant minister of Springburn. His first full charge was Linwood in 1936. In 1940 he translated to Houston and Killellan. He was Clerk to the Presbytery of Paisley 1953 to 1959 and became Clerk to the Presbytery of Glasgow in 1959, retaining this role until 1981. From 1961 to 1992 (post-retiral) he was Editor of the Church of Scotland Yearbook.

His role as Moderator 1971/72 was succeeded by Very Rev Ronald Selby Wright.

He retired in 1981 and died in Giffnock on 27 February 2003 aged 93.

Family
In 1935 he married Joanna Fraser Neill. They had four daughters and a son.

Publications
A Guide to Congregational Affairs (1978)
A Guide to the Presbytery (1983)
Kirk by Divine Right (1985)
A Guide to Ministerial Income (1987)
The Law and Practice of the Kirk (1995)
Kirk Lore (1999)
A Guide to the General Assembly of the Church of Scotland
A Guide to the Ministry

Herron helped to establish the Church of Scotland's own publishing house: the St Andrew Press in 1954.

References

1909 births
2003 deaths
20th-century biblical scholars
Alumni of the University of Glasgow
British biblical scholars
Moderators of the General Assembly of the Church of Scotland
Calvinist and Reformed biblical scholars
20th-century Christian biblical scholars
20th-century Ministers of the Church of Scotland
21st-century Ministers of the Church of Scotland